Iron Springs is a hamlet in southern Alberta, Canada within the Lethbridge County. It was founded in 1925 when the railroad arrived. The community was named after a spring of the same name near the original town site.

Demographics 

See also 
List of communities in Alberta
List of designated places in Alberta
List of hamlets in Alberta

References 

Hamlets in Alberta
Designated places in Alberta
Lethbridge County